Tamest is a commune in Fenoughil District, Adrar Province, south-central Algeria. According to the 2008 census it has a population of 8,266, up from 6,658 in 1998, with an annual growth rate of 2.2%.

Geography

These oases form part of a long longer string of oases known as the Tuat region, running from north to south through Adrar Province. Beyond the oases, the sandy Erg Chech desert lies to the west and the rocky Tademaït plateau lies to the east.

Climate

 

Tamest has a hot desert climate (Köppen climate classification BWh), with extremely hot summers and mild winters, and very little precipitation throughout the year.

Transportation

The main road in Tamest commune is the N6 national highway, which runs through the commune from north to south, and connects to Adrar in the north and Reggane in the south. Some local villages lie on the side of the highway while others are connected by short local roads.

Education

5.5% of the population has a tertiary education, and another 12.8% has completed secondary education. The overall literacy rate is 75.3%, and is 85.6% among males and 65.1% among females.

Localities
As of 1984, the commune was composed of 11 localities:

El Ahmar
Titaf
Rharmianou
Arhil
Temassekht
Ikkas
Ramalt
Ouled Antar
Djedid
Ouled Bou Yahia
Essoufia

References 

Neighbouring towns and cities

Communes of Adrar Province
Cities in Algeria
Algeria